Weena is a street in Rotterdam, the Netherlands

Weena may also refer to:

Weena (The Time Machine), a character from the H.G. Wells novel The Time Machine and various adaptions of the novel
Weena Mercator, a character from the animated series Freakazoid!
Weena Morloch, a German electronic music band